Spring Grove Hospital Center, formerly known as Spring Grove State Hospital, is a psychiatric hospital located in the Baltimore, Maryland, suburb of Catonsville.

Founded in 1797 as a general medical and psychiatric retreat, Spring Grove Mental Hospital is the second oldest continuously operating psychiatric hospital in the United States. Today, the hospital operates 425 beds  and has approximately 800 admissions and discharges a year.  Service lines include adult and adolescent acute psychiatric admissions, long term inpatient care, medical-psychiatric hospitalization, forensic evaluation services, inpatient psychiatric research, and assisted living services. The facility is owned and operated by the State of Maryland and is the location of the Maryland Psychiatric Research Center which is renowned for its research into the causes of schizophrenia.

History

18th Century
Founded in 1797, Spring Grove is the nation's second-oldest psychiatric hospital, though until recently operated as a medical and surgical hospital as well.  Only the Eastern State Hospital which was founded in 1773 in Williamsburg, Virginia, is older. In its long history it has been variously known as The Baltimore Hospital, The Maryland Hospital, The Maryland Hospital for the Insane, and finally as The Spring Grove Hospital Center.  It was originally built as a hospital to care for Yellow Fever for the indigent away from the city, as the Maryland Hospital. In 1840 the hospital expanded to exclusively care for the mentally ill. In 1873, the buildings were torn down as the facility relocated to Spring Hill. The original site is now home to the Johns Hopkins Bloomberg School of Public Health.

19th Century
The present site was purchased in 1852 by which time the original buildings had become inadequate. Dr. Richard Sprigg Steuart, then President of the Board and Medical Superintendent, managed to obtain authorization and funding from the Maryland General Assembly for the construction of the new facility at Spring Grove. In co-operation with the social reformer Dorothea Dix, who in 1852 gave an impassioned speech to the Maryland legislature, Steuart chaired the committee that selected the hospital's present site in Catonsville, and he personally contributed $1,000 towards the purchase of the land.

The cost of purchasing  of land for the hospital was $14,000, of which $12,340 was raised through private contributions. The purchase was completed in 1853, but construction of the new buildings was delayed by the Civil War, and the hospital was not finally completed until 1872, when it was described by one contemporary as "one of the largest and best appointed Insane Asylums in the United States". 
 
Steuart's brother, Major General George H. Steuart, had two sons who had mental illness, and it is possible that this was one of the causes of Steuart's particular interest in Spring Grove Hospital and the treatment of mental illness.

Steuart's building (known at various times as "The Main Building", "The Center Building" or "The Administration Building,") remained the main hospital facility for almost 100 years.

20th Century
Steuart's buildings were demolished in 1963, replaced by more modern construction.

Future
In 2014, Baltimore County plans on subdividing the hospital campus in order to create an 8.8 acre regional park for the Catonsville community. Additional plans include expansion of the University of Maryland, Baltimore County campus south of Wilkens Avenue to the Spring Grove campus, where the university still has the rights to a portion of the property.

In May 2022, Governor Larry Hogan's administration proposed transferring the hospital campus to the University of Maryland, Baltimore County for $1. The Maryland Board of Public Works voted 2–1 to approve the sale of the campus, with Hogan and Treasurer Dereck E. Davis supporting the lease agreement and Comptroller Peter Franchot dissenting, on May 15, 2022.

See also
Spring Grove Experiment

References
 Helsel, David S., and Trevor J. Blank. Spring Grove State Hospital (Images of America: Maryland) Arcadia Publishing, 2008 
 Nelker, Gladys P., The Clan Steuart, Genealogical publishing, 1970.

Notes

External links
Spring Grove Baseball Club. Plays on the grounds of Spring Grove Hospital Center at the Weltmer Bowl. http://www.leaguelineup.com/welcome.asp?url=shep
"Spring Grove State Hospital" by David S. Helsel, M.D. and Trevor J. Blank (Arcadia 2008)
Spring Grove History Photo Tour (Maryland Department of Health)

Catonsville, Maryland
Psychiatric hospitals in Maryland
Hospital buildings completed in 1872
Hospitals in Baltimore County, Maryland
Baltimore County, Maryland landmarks
Kirkbride Plan hospitals